Signe Lagerborg-Stenius (4 April 1870 - 15 July 1968) was a Finnish architect, member the Helsinki City Council (1926-1930, 1933–1944). She was the second woman in Finland to complete a four-year course at the Polytechnic.

Early life and education 
Signe Lagerborg was born on 4 April 1870 in Helsinki to a noble family of Robert Olof Lagerborg and Carolina Lovisa Constance Furuhjelm. In 1892, Lagerborg studied architecture at Helsinki Polytechnic Institute, graduating in 1892. She became the second female to graduate a four-year program at the Helsinki Polytechnic Institute. Additionally, Lagerborg, was trained as a drawing teacher at the University of Helsinki. After her study trips to Sweden, Denmark and Central Europe, Lagerborg became the first female architect to work for the General Board of Public Buildings, where she worked from 1892 to 1905.

Career 

After Lagerbord married an architect Gunnar Stenius in 1905, she worked at her husband's agency, and at the same time had her own private practice, as well as worked as a drawing teacher at the School of Crafts. Lagerborg-Stenius primarily dealt with the erection and construction methods of the new apartments.

In 1905 Lagerborg-Stenius drew one orphanage and a home for unmarried mothers, which was completed. As an architect at the Child Welfare Association in Finland, she designed four buildings, all of which have been preserved.

Besides a career in architecture, Lagerborg-Stenius was an active female advocate involved in women movement.

She was also a member of the city council in Helsinki in 1926–30, and in 1933–44.

Signe Lagerbord-Stenius died on 15 July 1968 in Helsinki.

References 

1870 births
1968 deaths
Finnish women architects
20th-century women artists
Finnish feminists
People from Helsinki